Rufus Maurice Hatchett (November 8, 1888 – death date unknown) was an American Negro league second baseman in the 1910s.

A native of New York, New York, Hatchett made his Negro leagues debut in 1913 with the Brooklyn Royal Giants. He went on to play for the Cuban Giants and Philadelphia Giants.

References

External links
 and Seamheads

1888 births
Year of death missing
Place of death missing
Brooklyn Royal Giants players
Cuban Giants players
Philadelphia Giants players